The Kids Are Alright can refer to:

"The Kids Are Alright" (song), a 1966 song by The Who
The Kids Are Alright (1979 film), 1979 documentary film about the English rock band The Who
The Kids Are Alright (soundtrack), the soundtrack album to the documentary
"The Kids Are Alright" (That '70s Show), a 2003 episode of the television series That '70s Show 
"The Kids Are Alright", an episode of Avengers: Ultron Revolution
 "The Kids Are Alright" (Supernatural), a 2007 episode of the television series Supernatural
"The Kids Are Alright" (Ugly Betty), a 2008 episode from the American television series Ugly Betty
The Kids Are Alright (album), a 2018 album by Chloe x Halle
The Kids Are Alright (TV series), a 2018 American comedy TV series
The Kids Are Alright (2021 film), a 2021 Spanish family comedy film.

See also 

 The Kids Are All Right (film), a 2010 comedy-drama film
 The Kids Are All Right (game show), a British game show
 "The Kids Aren't Alright", a 1998 song by The Offspring
 "The Kids Are Alt-right", a 2018 song by Bad Religion